R.W.D. Molenbeek, short for Racing White Daring Molenbeek, was a Belgian football club founded in 1909 as White Star Club de Bruxelles.  It then became a member of the Belgian Football Association later the same year as White Star Athletic Club and received the registration number 47.

History

White Star A.C. history
The club played several seasons in the first division (1924–25 and from 1934-35 to 1946-47) first as White Star Woluwé A.C. then as Royal White Star A.C. The present White Star Woluwé F.C. took its name from this team, but is not otherwise related.

Racing White history
In 1963 the club merged with Racing de Bruxelles to become Royal Racing White. It played in the first division from 1965 until 1973 after two seasons in the second division. Its homeground was the Stade Fallon in Woluwe-Saint-Lambert, Brussels till the club merged with the famous Daring Club de Bruxelles in July 1973, becoming R.W.D. Molenbeek.  The main reason of that merger was the poor league attendance.

R.W.D. Molenbeek history
The club played in the first division for ten seasons after its inception, winning the Belgian Championship in 1974-75, regularly qualifying for European competitions and even reaching the semi final of the 1976-77 UEFA Cup. Since the club had kept the registration number 47 of R. Racing White it could begin in the first division but it had lost the honours of the Daring Club. The club played in Molenbeek-Saint-Jean, Brussels.

From 1984, the club encountered many difficulties, leading to bankruptcy in 2002. 

During the season 2002-2003, K.F.C. Strombeek (located near Brussels) moved to the Edmond Machtens Stadium and became F.C. Molenbeek Brussels Strombeek the next season. The new club, which used Strombeek's matricule (registration) №1936, subsequently began in the second division but was promoted to the Belgian First Division in 2004.

At the same time, a group of fans, who fought to keep the name alive, had also recreated a new team called RWD Molenbeek (with a new registration number) in 2003. The new team started at the very bottom of the Belgian football league system - provincial division 4 in Brabant (level 8), but has been promoted to the Brabant provincial division 1 (level 5 in Belgium) in 2006 after absorbing another team from the Brabant province. In 2015, the matricule of Standaard Wetteren was sold to a group of investors who started the club RWDM47, trying to reinstate the history of the club.

European Cup History

Honours

Belgian First Division:
Winners: 1974-75
Belgian Second Division:
Winners: 1923-24, 1933–34, 1964–65, 1984–85, 1989–90
Belgian Second Division Final Round:
Winners: 2001
Belgian Cup:
Runners-up: 1968-69

References
 Official website

 
Association football clubs established in 1909
Association football clubs disestablished in 2002
1909 establishments in Belgium
2002 disestablishments in Belgium
20th century in Brussels
Defunct football clubs in Brussels
Molenbeek-Saint-Jean
Belgian Pro League clubs